Mahesh Bhatt (born 20 September 1948) is an Indian film director, producer and screenwriter known for his works in Hindi cinema. A stand-out film from his earlier period is Saaransh (1984), screened at the 14th Moscow International Film Festival. It became India's official entry for the Academy Award for Best Foreign Language Film for that year. The 1986 film Naam was his first piece of commercial cinema. In 1987, he turned producer with the film Kabzaa under the banner, "Vishesh Films", with his brother Mukesh Bhatt.

Bhatt went on to become one of the most recognized directors of the Indian film industry in the next decade, giving both art-house works such as Daddy (1989) and Swayam (1991), as well as commercial romantic hits like Awaargi (1990), Aashiqui (1990) and Dil Hai Ki Manta Nahin (1991), in which he cast Pooja with actor Aamir Khan. He next directed Sadak (1991) which was a hit and it remains his highest grossing either directed or produced under the banner, "Vishesh Films".

During the 1990s Bhatt won critical acclaim for Sir (1993), along with other hits such as Gumraah (1993) and Criminal (1994). In 1994 he won the National Film Award – Special Jury Award for directing Hum Hain Rahi Pyar Ke (1993). In 1996, he directed Tamanna, which won the National Film Award for Best Film on Other Social Issues. In 1999, he directed the autobiographical Zakhm, which has garnered the Nargis Dutt Award for Best Feature Film on National Integration. Bhatt has produced contemporary films such as Jism, Murder and Woh Lamhe. He co-owns film producing company Vishesh Films with his brother Mukesh Bhatt.

Early life
Bhatt was born to Nanabhai Bhatt and Shirin Mohammad Ali. Bhatt's father was a Gujarati Hindu Nagar Brahmin and his mother was a Gujarati Muslim.

Among his siblings is the Indian film producer Mukesh Bhatt.  Bhatt did his schooling from Don Bosco High School, Matunga. While still in school, Bhatt started summer jobs to earn money, while also making product advertisements. He was introduced to film director Raj Khosla through acquaintances. Bhatt thus started as an assistant director to Khosla.

Mainstream
 
At the age of 26, Bhatt made his debut as a director with the film Manzilein Aur Bhi Hain starring Kabir Bedi and Prema Narayan in 1974. His 1979 Lahu Ke Do Rang, starring Shabana Azmi and Vinod Khanna in lead roles, won two Filmfare Awards in 1980: Helen received her first Filmfare as Best Supporting Actress and Madhukar Shinde won it for Best Art Direction. The film did "above average" at the box office. He was noticed and received great critical acclaim with art film Arth (1982), when he turned to his personal life for inspiration but doubt persists as to whether it is an original film. Later, he made many more films taking insights from his personal life wherein he highlighted personal narratives ranging from out-of-wedlock birth to extramarital affair, and created critically acclaimed works such as Janam (1985) and Saaransh (1984),  an exploration of an old couple's anxieties in a universe governed by arbitrary violence.

Bhatt had one of his biggest releases with musical romance film Aashiqui (1990), in collaboration with T-Series. The film launched Rahul Roy, Anu Aggarwal, and Deepak Tijori in the lead roles and became a major commercial success due to the hugely popular soundtrack by Nadeem-Shravan, which catapulted the music director duo into stardom. He launched his daughter Pooja Bhatt as a lead actress opposite Aamir Khan in Dil Hai Ki Manta Nahin (1991). The film was a commercial success and hugely acclaimed for its soundtrack. Bhatt's directorial Saathi (1991) was the only major success for Aditya Pancholi as a lead actor, thus giving a boost to his career.

Bhatt's biggest release during that time was  Sir (1993). The film launched Atul Agnihotri opposite Pooja Bhatt and Naseeruddin Shah was featured in the title role of an aspiring and dedicated teacher. The film was a commercial success and gained critical acclaim for Bhatt's direction and the acting of Shah, Pooja, Agnihotri, and Paresh Rawal. The film had an acclaimed and popular soundtrack by Anu Malik, which gave a boost to the music director's stellar career and he joined the league of top music directors of Bollywood.

In 1995 he moved to television, then a newly opening medium in India. He made two TV series in 1995: the English language A Mouthful of Sky written by Ashok Banker and the popular Hindi language serial Swabhimaan scripted by the writer Shobha De. He directed another TV series, Kabhie Kabhie, in 1997 which was written by Anurag Kashyap, Vinta Nanda and Kamlesh Kunti Singh. Following this, he directed dramas like Dastak (1996), the debut film of Miss Universe 1994-turned-actress Sushmita Sen, and Tamanna (1997), and tried his hand at comedy with Duplicate in 1998. Zakhm (1998) based on the Mumbai riots of 1993.

His last film as director was Kartoos (1999) which did average business at the box office. Thereafter, Bhatt retired a director and took to screenwriting, churning out stories and screenplays for over twenty films, many of which were box-office successes, like Dushman, Raaz, Murder (2004), Gangster (2006), Woh Lamhe (2006), based on the life of actress Parveen Babi, along with many more. His banner vishesh films still continues operating today as one of Indian Cinemas leading production banners. Bhatt entered into the world of theatre with his protege Imran Zahid as of now he has produced three plays. The Last Salute, based on Muntadhar al-Zaidi's book of the same title, a journalist investigating atrocities Trial of Errors, that opened on 29 March 2013 in Delhi. stage adaptation of Bhatt of his movie, Arth (film). Bhatt also produced The Last Salute, a play directed by Arvind Gaur, based on Muntadhar al-Zaidi's book, starring Imran Zahid.

Other professional work
Bhatt is co-owner of the film production house, Vishesh Films, with Mukesh Bhatt. However owing to differences between the brothers, Mukesh Bhatt took over Vishesh films and in May 2021, it was publicly announced that Mahesh Bhatt was no more associated with the firm. He is a member of the advisory board of U.S. nonprofit TeachAids.

He has hosted some episodes of two science magazine programmes - Turning Point and Imaging Science on Doordarshan in 1990s.

 Bhatt was a member of the Board of Patrons of the Mother Teresa Awards.

Political views
Bhatt believes the Congress party is committed to secularism. In the 2014 Lok Sabha elections, he campaigned in a Karvan-e-Bedari (caravan of awareness) asking people to vote for Congress and defeat BJP's Prime Ministerial candidate Narendra Modi, as he believes that Mr. Modi is communal. Bhatt also criticizes the communal record of Congress Party, for its role in 1984 Sikh riots. He is planning to make a film, which will address the riots that took place in Delhi. Mahesh Bhatt supported the Islamic preacher Zakir Naik when the latter was denied entry into the United Kingdom for his controversial comments on terrorism.

Personal life
In 1970, Bhatt married Lorraine Bright (later name changed to Kiran Bhatt). His romance with her was the inspiration for his film Aashiqui. The couple's daughter Pooja is a filmmaker and actress, and son Rahul is an aspiring actor. Bhatt began an affair with 1970s actress, Parveen Babi. As the affair did not last long, Bhatt later married Soni Razdan in 1986 and they had two daughters, Shaheen and Alia. Alia is an actress having played roles in more than 20 films. 
Mahesh Bhatt is also an uncle of Hindi film actor Emraan Hashmi and filmmakers Mohit Suri and Milan Luthria. Hashmi is his cousin Anwar's son, Suri is his sister Heena's son and Luthria is his mother Shirin's grand-nephew.

In the 1970s, he became a follower of Osho, and later found spiritual companionship and guidance with philosopher, U.G. Krishnamurti. Bhatt calls Krishnamurti his lifeline and says "Take him away, and I am empty". Bhatt in 1992 wrote Krishnamurti's biography titled U.G. Krishnamurti, A Life. Apart from this he has edited several books based on conversations with U.G. Krishnamurti. Bhatt's latest book A Taste of Life: The Last Days of U.G. Krishnamurti was published in June 2009.

Legacy
As a director and producer, Mahesh Bhatt has a legacy of mentoring many actors and actresses and launching their careers, giving big names to Bollywood. He is notable for launching the careers of Anupam Kher in Saaransh (1984), Rahul Roy, Anu Aggarwal and Deepak Tijori in Aashiqui (1990), daughter Pooja Bhatt in Dil Hai Ki Manta Nahin and Sadak (1991), Atul Agnihotri in Sir (1993), Sonali Bendre in Naaraaz (1994), Samir Soni in A Mouthful of Sky (1995), Sharad Kapoor, Sushmita Sen and Mukul Dev in Dastak (1996), Manoj Bajpayee in Dastak (1996), Ashutosh Rana in Tamanna (1997),  Dushman (1998) and Sangharsh (1999), Aftab Shivdasani in Kasoor (2001), Dino Morea and Bipasha Basu in Raaz (2002), Aparna Tilak in Footpath (2003), Emraan Hashmi in Footpath and Murder (2004), Mallika Sherawat in Murder (2004), Kunal Khemu in Kalyug (2005), Shiney Ahuja and Kangana Ranaut in Gangster and Woh Lamhe (2006) and Sunny Leone in Jism 2 (2012).

Bhatt has also given breakthrough to many stars, bringing turning point in their careers. These names include Sanjay Dutt and Kumar Gaurav in Naam (1986), Aditya Pancholi in Saathi (1991), Paresh Rawal in Sir (1993), and Shraddha Kapoor and Aditya Roy Kapoor in Aashiqui 2 (2013).

Bhatt is also known for his choice of music. Many composers had their first mainstream success in Bollywood while working with him. Nadeem-Shravan had their first hit album in Bollywood with Bhatt's directorial Aashiqui, which established them as the biggest music directors for the next decade. They would collaborate with Bhatt in many films to create successful soundtracks. Examples include Dil Hai Ki Manta Nahin, Sadak and Saathi (1991), Junoon (1992), Tadipaar and Hum Hain Rahi Pyar Ke (1993). Nadeem-Shravan went on to compose music for several productions of Vishesh Films.

Filmography

Films

Television

Web series

References

External links
 

Living people
Don Bosco schools alumni
Rajneesh movement
Gujarati people
20th-century Indian film directors
Indian male screenwriters
Film directors from Mumbai
Hindi-language film directors
Converts to Islam from Hinduism
Film producers from Mumbai
Indian television directors
Filmfare Awards winners
Hindi film producers
1948 births
Mahesh
Hindi screenwriters
20th-century Indian dramatists and playwrights
21st-century Indian dramatists and playwrights
Screenwriters from Maharashtra
20th-century Indian male writers
21st-century Indian male writers
Directors who won the Best Film on National Integration National Film Award
Directors who won the Best Film on Other Social Issues National Film Award